The Journal of NeuroVirology is a medical journal that publishes review articles on the molecular biology, immunology, genetics, epidemiology, and pathogenesis of CNS disorders with the goal of bridging the gap between basic and clinical studies, and enhancing translational research in neurovirology. It is published by Springer Science+Business Media. The Journal of NeuroVirology is the official journal of the International Society for Neurovirology.

Abstracting and indexing
The journal is abstracted and indexed in:
 Science Citation Index Expanded
 Journal Citation Reports/Science Edition 
 SCOPUS
 PsycINFO
 EMBASE 
 Chemical Abstracts Service 
 CSA Illumina 
 Biological Abstracts 
 BIOSIS 
 CAB Abstracts 
 Current Contents/ Life Sciences 
 Global Health
 Neuroscience Citation Index 
 PASCAL
 Summon by Serial Solutions

External links
Journal of NeuroVirology
Springer - Journal of NeuroVirology
International Society of Neurovirology
 Editorial board

Neuroscience journals
Springer Science+Business Media academic journals
Publications established in 1994
Bimonthly journals
Virology journals